Rodney Lee Cool (March 8, 1920 – April 16, 1988) was an American physicist who helped to establish the existence of the quark.

Cool was a professor of high-energy physics at Rockefeller University, a member of the National Academies of Sciences.
He was also a Fellow of the American Physical Society.
Cool founded an experimental physics group at Rockefeller University in 1970.

Life and career 
Cool graduated with a bachelor's degree from the University of South Dakota and received his M.S. and Ph.D. degrees from Harvard University.
He also worked at European Organization for Nuclear Research in Geneva. There he and his colleagues performed experiments that showed the quark to be a building block of neutrons and protons.

References

External links
National Academy of Sciences Biographical Memoir

1920 births
1988 deaths
20th-century American physicists
Members of the United States National Academy of Sciences
Harvard University alumni
University of South Dakota alumni
Fellows of the American Physical Society
Rockefeller University faculty